The morning roll is an airy, chewy bread roll popular in Scotland.

Variants
The well-fired roll is  given a stronger flavour in its bulk fermentation and baked at a higher temperature.

In Fife, a cabin biscuit or cabin roll ( or ) is a local variant. Originating in Buckhaven, extra sugar was added to extend the life of the roll, for use by crews on fishing boats. They bear distinctive prick marks on top. It is a bread roll and not similar to a biscuit in the conventional British or American sense.

Traditional fillings 

 butter
 Lorne sausage
 bacon
 link sausage
 fried egg
 black pudding
 potato scone
 Scotch pie
 Chips

Purchase locations
Scottish morning rolls are not traditionally purchased from supermarkets, but from bakeries, newsagents, corner shops, butcher shops, and fish and chip shops. Recently, however, supermarkets such as the Scotmid have made deals with local bakeries to provide the rolls in-store.

Standard ingredients
 wheat flour
 water
 salt
 yeast
 malted barley flour
 vegetable oil
 sugar
 dextrose
 flour treatment agent (E300)

See also
 Breakfast roll

References

Scottish breads